The Sochi Autodrom, previously known as the Sochi International Street Circuit and the Sochi Olympic Park Circuit, is a  permanent race track in the settlement of Sirius next to the Black Sea resort town of Sochi in Krasnodar Krai, Russia.

The circuit runs around a former Olympic complex, the Sochi Olympic Park site, scene of the 2014 Winter Olympic Games. The TCR International Series raced at Sochi in 2015 and 2016, with the TCR Russian Series and SMP F4 Championship as support series.

The contract was terminated before the 2022 edition due to the Russian invasion of Ukraine.

Development 

Earlier the International Olympic Committee was given the power to delay the race until 2015 if preparations for the race interfered with the Winter Olympics, though the Games started without interruption. In October 2011, the Russian government set aside US$195.4 million for the construction of the circuit.

The construction of the Sochi Olympic Park Circuit marked the end of a thirty-year campaign for a Russian Grand Prix, with plans for a "Grand Prix of the Soviet Union" originating as early as 1983 before being abandoned for "bureaucratic reasons" and several failed attempts in the intervening years. The circuit received its final approval from the FIA in August 2014.

The circuit 

The  circuit was the fifth-longest circuit on the 2021 Formula One calendar, behind Spa-Francorchamps in Belgium, Jeddah Street Circuit in Saudi Arabia, Baku City Circuit in Azerbaijan and Silverstone in the UK. The circuit is built around the Sochi Olympic Park, that is the coastal cluster of Olympic venues built for the 2014 Winter Olympics that have hosted competitions in ice hockey, speed skating, curling, figure skating, short track etc., and Fisht Olympic Stadium where Opening and Closing ceremonies were held. The surface was not laid until after the Closing Ceremony of the Olympics.

The circuit, designed by German architect Hermann Tilke, has the start grid on the northern edge of the Olympic Park next to the railway station, heading southwest towards the Black Sea coast. Then it runs along the outer edge of the central Sochi Medals Plaza, that is the podium for Olympic medal ceremonies. The long Turn 3 has been compared to Turn 8 in Istanbul Park. Then, the track circles the plaza counterclockwise and makes three turns around the Bolshoy Ice Dome. Then follow series of tight corners before turning north where the track skirts the edge of the Olympic Park, above the main Olympic Village and the Adler Arena Skating Center. Then it passes the skating and curling centres, before funneling up behind the pit paddock toward the train station, and completing a circuit with two ninety-degree right turns. The circuit held the Russian Grand Prix from 2014 to 2021. 

The circuit was initially planned to be included in the 2022 Formula One calendar, but the Russian Grand Prix was suspended on 24 February 2022, then it was cancelled on 1 March 2022, due to the Russian invasion of Ukraine.

Events

 Current

 April: Russian Circuit Racing Series
 October: Russian Endurance Challenge

 Former

 Ferrari Challenge Europe (2016)
 FIA Formula 2 Championship (2018–2021)
 FIA Formula 3 Championship (2019, 2021)
 Formula One Russian Grand Prix (2014–2021)
 GP2 Series (2014–2015)
 GP3 Series (2014–2015, 2018)
 SMP F4 Championship (2015–2017)
 TCR International Series (2015–2016)
 World Touring Car Cup FIA WTCR Race of Russia (2021)

Lap records 
The official lap record for the current circuit layout is 1:35.761, set by Lewis Hamilton during the 2019 Russian Grand Prix. The official race lap records at the Sochi Autodrom are listed as:

See also 
2014 Winter Olympics

References

External links 

Sochi Autodrom photos
OMEGA Center (official development site)
Sochi Autodrom Guide 
Sochi Autodrom on Google Maps (Current Formula 1 Tracks)

Formula One circuits
World Touring Car Championship circuits
Motorsport venues in Russia
Sport in Sochi
Venues of the 2014 Winter Olympics
Buildings and structures in Sochi
Sports venues completed in 2014
Racing circuits designed by Hermann Tilke
2014 establishments in Russia